José Manuel Nicolás Ayén (born 22 September 2003), known as José Manuel, is a Spanish professional footballer who plays as a central midfielder for FC Cartagena B.

Club career
Born in Murcia, José Manuel played for Beniaján UCAM CF before signing a contract with FC Cartagena on 21 June 2021; he was initially assigned to the Juvenil squad. He made his senior debut with the reserves on 31 October, coming on as a second-half substitute in a 1–1 Tercera División RFEF away draw against UD Caravaca.

José Manuel made his first team debut on 7 November 2021, replacing Yann Bodiger late into a 3–1 home defeat of Málaga CF in the Segunda División. Four days later, he extended his contract with the club until 2024.

References

External links

2003 births
Living people
Footballers from Murcia
Spanish footballers
Association football midfielders
Segunda División players
Tercera Federación players
FC Cartagena B players
FC Cartagena footballers